A  is a traditional crockery casserole vessel found in France. It is famed for its "pot-belly" shape. 

According to the French culinary reference work , a  can be either a stock pot or "a French pot with lid similar to a casserole with two finger-grips on each side." 

See also
 List of cooking vessels

References

Cooking vessels